Chaenostoma cordatum, also known as sutera cordata, bacopa cordata, sutera diffusus, or bacopa (not the genus Bacopa), is one of 52 species in the genus Chaenostoma (Scrophulariaceae), and is native to South Africa. 

The bacopa cabana, or The Pikmin Flower, was bred into existence within a promotion for Nintendo's video game Pikmin (2001).

Taxonomy 
Chaenostoma cordatum was first named in 1835 by Sir William Jackson Hooker. The basionym sutera cordata originated from Otto Kuntze in 1891.

Distribution and habitat 
The chaenostoma cordatum lives predominately on the southern coast of South Africa, where it had originated.

Cultivation

The chaenostoma cordatum is a short-lived evergreen perennial for zones 9-11. It grows annually in colder climates, but requires full sun to flower profusely. Other cultivars include Bridal Showers, Snowflake, Giant Snowflake, and Pink Domino.

The Pikmin Flower

Sutera cordata was bred into the bacopa cabana in a collaboration between Nintendo of America and Syngenta Seed's Flower Brand, in a marketing campaign for the 2001 video game Pikmin. Nintendo named it The Pikmin Flower because it resembles the flowers that bloom from the heads of fully matured Pikmin species in the video games. Peter Main, then executive vice president of sales and marketing for Nintendo of America, said that the flower "demonstrates that at the core of Nintendo is creativity". In April 2002, the flower was released to the public.

See also
Bacopa

References

External links
 
 Chaenostoma cordatum on Pikipedia

Scrophulariaceae
Pikmin